The South Asian Inter-Scholastic Association (better known as SAISA) brings together 11 top international schools from across the Indian subcontinent region to compete against one another in sports, music and other extracurricular activities. It is comparable to other regional networks of international schools, such as the Interscholastic Association of Southeast Asian Schools (IASAS), operating in Southeast Asia.

SAISA events enable students to represent their schools, visit other international schools in the region, and to sample and experience homestays with other families. The event participants must comply to a strict code of conduct.

Purpose
The purpose of SAISA is to promote and coordinate regional professional development activities, academic and cultural festivals, athletic tournaments, and other events deemed appropriate by the member schools.

As educators committed to the ideal of realising the full potential of each student, we believe the fundamental aim of SAISA is to promote the values of collaboration, creativity, sportsmanship, and fair and ethical competition.

While acknowledging the notion of ‘winning’ in sporting events and other competitions, a recognition more critical is that students come together to participate in various activities in the truest spirit of cooperation and competition, and develop physically, emotionally, creatively and intellectually through the sporting, academic and artistic experiences themselves.

To ensure its realisation in each SAISA event, the above aim is to be included in the correspondence between each school, its students and parents.

	International School of Islamabad (ISI - now ISOI), Lahore American School (LAS), Karachi American School (KAS), Murree Christian School (MCS) and the American International School of Kabul (AISK) came together to become the South Asia Inter-Schools Association (SAISA). This was a way for the schools to give their students a cross cultural opportunity, to play competitive sports and make new friends.

	The schools annually arranged sporting, cultural and academic events. These included flag football, basketball, field hockey and soccer; track & field, swimming, tennis, badminton and table tennis.  Cultural events consisted of drama, with each school performing a one-act play, music, and art. Academically, College Bowl, debate and chess also featured. Small schools like MCS typically closed down for a week in order to participate in multiple events. These events were all held on the same week, not spread out over the year as they are currently. Later, other international schools around South Asia began to join the organization. The American Embassy School (AES) Delhi joined SAISA after the Soviet invasion of Afghanistan in 1979, which also ended Kabul’s involvement in SAISA.

	By the early nineties, the original schools were joined by the American International School of Dhaka (AISD), the Overseas Children’s School of Colombo (OCS and Lincoln School, Kathmandu (LS). OCS later became the Overseas School of Colombo (OSC). In the early nineties, SAISA decided to split into two divisions, East and West, for swimming and track & field. Three major all-SAISA sports tournaments were held per year. However, during the 1996-97 academic year tournaments were "split"; for instance, the Boys Soccer and Girls Basketball tournaments, which had recently been hosted together at AES (1993–94), ISI (1994–95), and again at AES (1995–96), were split between ISI (Boys Soccer) and LAS (Girls Basketball), thereby allowing some of the smaller schools to host events. Meanwhile, the Cultural Convention focused on music, drama and art. Later art was dropped from the program. Soon after AISC or The American International School of Chennai joined,
	When the decision was made to do music and drama separately, the idea was to rotate these each year so that schools could attend only one event would be able to do music on year and drama the next. However, the logistics proved too complex and by the mid-90s, drama had settled into a February slot and music into April. Only the large schools like Islamabad, Delhi and Dhaka, which had large campuses and enough housing for all participants, were able to host the all-SAISA events. This limited smaller schools to hosting East/West tournaments, split tournaments, or middle school-only events. MCS, for example, hosted the SAISA West Middle School Boys Soccer tournament with participants from Lahore, Karachi and Islamabad staying at the nearby Pearl Continental hotel in Bhurban.

	Over time, events like art, racquet sports, College Bowl, debate and chess were all shelved. Flag football disappeared from the schedule in the mid-80s as more and more local students, who were not familiar with American football, enrolled in member schools. The core sports became soccer (Boys), basketball (Boys and Girls), field hockey (Boys and Girls), and volleyball (Girls). Field hockey was cut after the 1994-95 academic year because insurance premiums were too high and replaced with volleyball for boys and soccer for girls. The final Girls Field Hockey tournament, played at KAS in the fall of 1994, was won by ISI, which defeated KAS in penalty strokes 1-0 after a scoreless match. The final Boys Field Hockey tournament was a split tournament hosted by LAS, in which the hosts defeated surprise finalist ISI 1-0. (In fact, this tournament was the nail in the sport's coffin, as a player from AES was struck in the face by a stick, complained of headaches, and later had to be medevac'd for life-saving surgery to repair a crushed sinus.)

	SAISA tournaments during the 80s also including cheerleading, which is not included in today’s programs. As the organization spread out over a larger area, resulting in teams' traveling internationally to attend tournaments, it became prohibitively expensive to take squads of cheerleaders. Cultural sensitivities were also a factor in the decision to discontinue cheerleading, given the typically scanty uniforms worn by cheerleaders. By the early 90s, cheering was simply each school's boys teams attending the girls' matches and cheering for them, and vice versa.

	SAISA provides the chance for students to get a break from the pressures of school work and to get out and visit other schools, mix with students from different backgrounds, share common experiences, develop new skills in the company of other like-minded young people, and make lifelong friends. All of these add up to far more than just a game of basketball or soccer, or an excellent dramatic production. SAISA is a tool, which forms character, a program that adds value to the educational experiences of young people, and an environment, which provides personal growth through students interacting in different cultural surroundings.

Activities

Athletic
 Competitive Swimming
 Volleyball
 Soccer
 Basketball
 Tennis
 Track & Field
 Badminton

Non-Athletic
 Art
 Music
 Band

Members

India
 American International School Chennai, Chennai (AISC Raptors)
 American School of Bombay, Mumbai (ASB Eagles)

Bangladesh
 American International School of Dhaka, Dhaka (AISD Tigers)

Nepal
 Lincoln School, Kathmandu (LS Snow Leopards)

Sri Lanka
 Overseas School of Colombo, Colombo (OSC Geckos)

Oman 

 The American International School Muscat, Muscat (TAISM Eagles)

Jordan 

 American Community School, Amman (ACS Scorpions)

Pakistan 
International School of Islamabad, Islamabad (ISOI Cobras)
Lahore American School, Lahore (LAS Buffalos)
Karachi American School. Karachi (KAS Knights)

Track and Field Records 
	SAISA is widely known for the track field program that it boasts. This programs also notes the records that are set, a list of which can be seen below

Girls 10-12

Boys 10-12

Girls 13-14

Boys 13-14

Girls 15-19

Boys 15-19 

*Last Revised May 21, 2018.

*Designated Bold for Records broken in 2019.

See also 
KISSL

References

External links
The new SAISA website: 

Associations of schools